Stepford (NX864815) was one of the minor request stop stations on the Cairn Valley Light Railway branch from Dumfries.  It served a very rural area in Dumfries and Galloway  The line was closed to passengers during the Second World War. Cairn Valley Junction lay to the east.

History 
The CVR was nominally independent, but was in reality controlled by the Glasgow and South Western Railway. The line was closed to passengers on 3 May 1943, during the Second World War and to freight on 4 July 1949, and the track lifted in 1953.

The station was very basic with just a short wooden platform with a tin shelter and a siding with a loading bank for goods traffic. A station master's house was provided, designed by the company with a pyramid roof truncated by a central chimney stack. The shelter had been demolished by 1949. The station master's house, a simple cottage, rather than the standard company design, survives as a private dwelling.

Morrington Quarry was nearby and was rail connected, however the contract was lost to a road haulier in around 1943.

The siding was worked by down trains only, goods for Dumfries being taken to the nearest station along. The points were unlocked with an Annett's key that was kept in a locked box on a post adjacent to the point.

Trains were controlled by a 'lock and block' system whereby the trains operated treadles on the single line to interact with the block instruments.

See also 

 List of closed railway stations in Britain

References 
Notes

Sources
 
 Kirkpatrick, Ian (2000). The Cairn Valley Light Railway. Usk : The Oakwood Press. .
 Sanders, Keith and Hodgins, Douglas (1995). British Railways. Past and Present South West Scotland. No. 19. .
 Thomas, David St John & Whitehouse, Patrick (1993). The Romance of Scotlands Railways. Newton Abbot : David St John Thomas. .

Disused railway stations in Dumfries and Galloway
Former Glasgow and South Western Railway stations
Railway stations in Great Britain opened in 1905
Railway stations in Great Britain closed in 1943